The non-marine molluscs of Somaliland are a part of the molluscan fauna of Somaliland (wildlife of Somaliland).

A number of species of non-marine molluscs are found in the wild in Somaliland.

Freshwater gastropods 
Freshwater gastropods in Somaliland include:

Planorbidae
 Bulinus abyssinicus (von Martens, 1866)

Lymnaeidae
 Radix natalensis (Krauss, 1848)

Land gastropods 
Land gastropods in Somaliland include:

Streptaxidae
 Somalitayloria Verdcourt, 1962 - endemic genus

Freshwater bivalves
Freshwater bivalves in Somaliland include:

See also
 List of marine molluscs of Somaliland, Wildlife of Somaliland

Lists of molluscs of surrounding countries:
 List of non-marine molluscs of Somalia, Wildlife of Somalia
 List of non-marine molluscs of Djibouti, Wildlife of Djibouti
 List of non-marine molluscs of Kenya, Wildlife of Kenya
 List of non-marine molluscs of Yemen, Wildlife of Yemen
 List of non-marine molluscs of Ethiopia, Wildlife of Ethiopia

References

External links 

 Non marine moll

Molluscs
Somaliland
Somaliland